Miodrag B. Protić (10 May 1922 – 20 December 2014) was a Serbian painter, art critic, theorist and historian of art of the 20th century.

Biography
Miodrag B. Protić was born in Vrnjačka Banja, on 10 May 1922. He finished elementary school in Vrnjačka Banja and high school in Kruševac. He graduated from University of Belgrade Faculty of Law in 1950. He studied art in Art School of Mladen Josić in 1943—1944 under Jovan Bijelić and Zora Petrović. Protić gained further education in Paris 1953—1954, in Italy and the United States in 1963.
From 1950 to 1959 he worked in the Ministry of Education, Science and Culture when he initiated the establishment of Modern Art Gallery in Belgrade, purchasing artwork from exhibitions and artist studios. He was appointed director of the Modern Art Gallery in 1959. On 20 October 1965, the Modern Art Gallery became the Museum of Contemporary Art in Belgrade. Protić, as its founder, continued as its head until he retired in 1980.
He began exhibiting in 1946 in numerous group exhibitions at home and abroad. His first solo exhibition was in 1956. He was a member of ULUS from 1948. He was a member of artistic groups  "The Independent" (1951–1955) and "The December Group" (1955–1960). Beginning in 1952 he published a number of books, papers, essays, and critiques on Serbian and Yugoslav art. He was a regular art critic for "NIN" between 1952 and 1958. He commentated for numerous newspapers and magazines, including "Glas", "Rad", "Politika", "Borba", "Danas", "Delo", "Savremenik", "Književnost", "Letopis Matice srpske", "Književne novine", and "Umetnost". He was a member of the Yugoslav Academy of Sciences and Arts in Zagreb from 1966 to 1991. He died on 20 December 2014 in Belgrade

Bibliography

Books and monographies 
1955 Savremenici I, Nolit, Beograd
1957 Sreten Stojanović, Prosveta, Beograd
1958 Milan Konjović, Forum, Novi Sad
1959 Milo Milunović, Prosveta, Beograd
1960 Slika i smisao, Nolit, Beograd
1964 Savremenici II, Nolit Beograd
1966 Jovan Bijelić, Jugoslavija, Beograd
1969 Dvadeseti vek, Umetničko blago Jugoslavije, Jugoslavija, Beograd
1970 Srpsko slikarstvo XX veka, I-II, Nolit, Beograd
1972 Milena Pavlović Barili, Prosveta, Beograd
1973 Jugoslovensko slikarstvo 1900–1950, BIGZ, Beograd
1976 Vladimir Veličković, Pière Belfond, Paris 
1979 Oblik i vreme, Nolit, Beograd
1979 Protić-Šutej, Biškupić, Zagreb
1980 — 1981 Ideje srpske umetničke kritike i teorije 1900–1950, I-III, Muzej savremene umetnosti, Beograd
1982 Skulptura XX veka, Jugoslavija, Beograd, Spektar, Zagreb, Prva književna komuna, Mostar
1982 Slikarstvo XX veka, Jugoslavija, Beograd, Spektar, Zagreb, Prva književna komuna, Mostar
1985 Sava Šumanović, Galerija „Sava Šumanović“, Šid
1985 Slika i utopija, Srpska književna zadruga, Beograd
1986 Milica Zorić, Jugoslovenska revija, Beograd
1986 Vladimir Veličković, Prosveta, Književne novine, Beograd, Mladinska knjiga, Ljubljana
1992 Nojeva barka I, Srpska književna zadruga, Beograd
1993 Srbi u evropskoj civilizaciji, Nova, Beograd
1994 Istorija srpske kulture, Forum, Novi Sad
1995 Otmica Evrope, Gradska narodna biblioteka „Žarko Zrenjanin“, Zrenjanin
1996 Nojeva barka II, Srpska književna zadruga, Beograd
2002 Nojeva barka I-II, Srpska književna zadruga, Beograd
2009 Nojeva barka III, Srpska književna zadruga, Beograd

Catalog prefaces (selection) 
 1951 Petar Lubarda, ULUS, Beograd
 1956 Decembarska grupa, Umetnički paviljon, Sarajevo; Umetnički paviljon, Beograd
 1960 Zora Petrović, Umetnički paviljon, Beograd
 1960 Milan Konjović, Galerija Doma JNA, Beograd
 1961 Nedeljko Gvozdenović, Salon Moderne galerije, Beograd
 1962 Milena Pavlović Barili, Galerija Milene Pavlović Barili, Požarevac
 1963 Peđa Milosavljević, Salon Muzeja savrememe umetnosti, Beograd
 1965 Milorad Bata Mihailović, Salon Moderne galerije, Beograd
 1966 Marko Čelebonović, Muzej savremene umetnosti, Beograd
 1967 Predrag Peđa Nešković, Salon Muzeja savremene umetnosti, Beograd
 1967 Petar Lubarda, retrospektiva, Muzej savremene umetnosti, Beograd
 1967 Treća decenija – konstruktivno slikarstvo, Muzej savremene umetnosti, Beograd
 1968 Jovan Bijelić, retrospektiva, Muzej savremene umetnosti, Beograd
 1968 Peđa Milosavljević, Umetnička galerija, Sarajevo
 1968 Umetnici XX veka akademici, Galerija SANU, Beograd
 1969 Nadrealizam i socijalna umetnost 1929–1950, Muzej savremene umetnosti, Beograd
 1969 Decembarska grupa 1955–1960, Galerija Kulturnog centra, Beograd
 1969 — 1970 Lazar Vozarević, retrospektiva, Muzej savremene umetnosti, Beograd
 1970 Nedeljko Gvozdenović, retrospektiva, Muzej savremene umetnosti, Beograd
 1971 Četvrta decenija – ekspresionizam boje i poetski realizam 1930–1940, Muzej savremene umetnosti, Beograd
 1971 Ivan Radović, Galerija SANU, Beograd
 1972 Srpska arhitektura 1900–1970, Muzej savremene umetnosti, Beograd
 1972 Leonid Šejka, retrospektiva, Muzej savremene umetnosti, Beograd
 1972 — 1973 Počeci jugoslovenskog modernog slikartsva 1900–1920, Muzej savremene umetnosti, Beograd
 1973 Od enformela do nove figuracije, Galerija Kulturnog centra, Beograd
 1974 Petar Dobrović, retrospektiva, Muzej savremene umetnosti, Beograd
 1975 Jugoslovenska skulptura 1870–1950, Muzej savremene umetnosti, Beograd
 1975 Srpski umetnici akademici, Galerija SANU, Beograd
 1975 Lazar Vozarević, Galerija savrememe umetnosti, Niš
 1977 Ivan Tabaković, retrospektiva, Muzej savremene umetnosti, Beograd
 1978 Jugoslovenska grafika 1900–1950, Muzej savremene umetnosti, Beograd
 1978 Predrag Peđa Milosavljević, retrospektiva, Muzej savremene umetnosti, Beograd
 1979 Milena Pavlović Barili, retrospektiva, Muzej savremene umetnosti, Beograd
 1980 Jugoslovensko slikarstvo šeste decenije, Muzej savremene umetnosti, Beograd
 1981 Bogdan Bogdanović, Galerija SANU, Beograd
 1984 Sava Šumanović, retrospektiva, Muzej savremene umetnosti, Beograd
 1985 — 1986 Jugoslovenska grafika 1950–1980, Muzej savremene umetnosti, Beograd
 1990 Vane Bor, Muzej savremene umetnosti, Beograd
 1993 — 1994 Legat Marka Ristića, Muzej savremene umetnosti, Beograd

Awards 
1967 Silver Medal of Merit of Czechoslovak Socialist Republic
1977 Order of Commander of Kingdom of Denmark
1981 Order of Merits for the People with Gold Star (I rank) of Socialist Federal Republic of Yugoslavia
1983 Order of Arts and Letters (Officer) of France

Works

References

External links
Artfacts
Rastko, Work Selection

Reading
Ješa Denegri, Radmila Matić Miodrag B. Protić, 2002

1922 births
2014 deaths
People from Vrnjačka Banja
Serbian painters
Yugoslav painters